Carol Shaw (born 1955) is one of the first female game designers and programmers in the video game industry. She is best known for creating the Atari 2600 vertically scrolling shooter River Raid (1982) for Activision. She worked for Atari, Inc. from 1978 to 1980 where she designed multiple games including 3-D Tic-Tac-Toe (1978) and Video Checkers (1980), both for the Atari VCS before it was renamed to the 2600. She left game development in 1984 and retired in 1990.

Early life and education
Shaw was born in 1955 and was raised in Palo Alto, California. Her father was a mechanical engineer and worked at the Stanford Linear Accelerator Center. In a 2011 interview, she said she did not like playing with dolls as a child, but learned about model railroading from playing with her brother's set, a hobby she continued until college. Shaw first used a computer in high school and discovered she could play text-based games on the system. Shaw attended the University of California, Berkeley and graduated with a B.S. in Electrical Engineering and Computer Science in 1977. She went on to complete a master's degree in Computer Science at Berkeley.

Career

Atari, Inc.
Shaw was hired at Atari, Inc. in 1978, straight out of her Master's, to work on games for the Atari VCS (later called the 2600) with an official job title of Microprocessor Software Engineer. Her first project was Polo, a promotional tie-in for the Ralph Lauren cologne. The game reached the prototype stage, but Atari chose not to publish it.

Shaw's first published game was 3-D Tic-Tac-Toe for the Atari 2600 in 1978. She also wrote Video Checkers (1980), and collaborated on two titles: a port of the coin-op game Super Breakout with Nick Turner and Othello with Ed Logg (1981). Co-worker Mike Albaugh later put her on a list of Atari's "less publicized superstars":

Shaw worked on several projects for the Atari 8-bit family of home computers. With Keith Brewster, she wrote the Atari BASIC Reference Manual. She developed the programmable Calculator application published by Atari on diskette in 1979.

Activision

Shaw left Atari in 1980 to work for Tandem Computers as an assembly language programmer, then joining Activision in 1982. Her first game was River Raid (1982) for the Atari 2600, which was inspired by the 1981 arcade game Scramble. The game was a major hit for Activision and personally lucrative for Shaw.

Shaw also wrote Happy Trails (1983) for the Intellivision and ported River Raid to the Atari 8-bit family and Atari 5200. She left Activision in 1984.

After games
In 1984 Shaw returned to her former employer, Tandem.  She took early retirement in 1990 and subsequently did some voluntary work including a position at the Foresight Institute. She has credited the success of River Raid as being a significant factor in enabling her to retire early.

In 2017, Shaw received the Industry Icon Award at The Game Awards. In the same year, she donated her gaming memorabilia, including games, boxes, source code, and designs, to the Strong National Museum of Play.

Personal life
Shaw lives in California and has been married to Ralph Merkle, a researcher in cryptography and nanotechnology, since 1983.

Works
Atari 2600
 3D Tic-Tac-Toe (Atari, 1978) 
 Othello (Atari, 1978) with Ed Logg,
 Video Checkers (Atari, 1980) 
 Super Breakout (Atari, 1981) with Nick Turner
 River Raid (Activision, 1982) 

Intellivision
 Happy Trails (Activision, 1983)

Atari 8-bit family
 Calculator (Atari, 1979) 
 River Raid (Activision, 1983) port from 2600 to Atari 8-bit and 5200

Unreleased
 Polo, Atari 2600 (Atari, 1978)

References

External links 
 Carol Shaw's games at Atari Age
 Center for Computing History
 Carol Shaw Papers 1960-2017

1955 births
Atari people
Living people
American video game designers
American video game programmers
Women video game designers
Women video game programmers
University of California, Berkeley alumni
The Game Awards winners